National Highway 108 (NH 108) is a highway in India. It originates from Panisagar of North Tripura District in Tripura and extends up to Aizawl in Mizoram. It connects Lengpui Airport with the state capital of Mizoram - Aizawl. The highway passes through towns of Zawlnuam and Mamit.

See also
 List of National Highways in India by highway number
 National Highways Development Project

References

External links
NH 108 on OpenStreetMap

National highways in India
National Highways in Assam
National Highways in Tripura
Transport in Aizawl